Prunus sect. Prunus is a section of Prunus subg. Prunus. It contains species of Eurasian plum.

Species 
Species in this section includes:

 Prunus bokhariensis
 Prunus cerasifera – cherry plum
 Prunus cocomilia – Italian plum, cuckoo's apple
 Prunus consociiflora – Hubei plum
 Prunus darvasica – Darwaz plum
 Prunus divaricata – wild cherry plum
 Prunus domestica – European plum
 Prunus ramburii – sloe of Sierra Nevada
 Prunus salicina – Chinese plum, Japanese plum
 Prunus simonii – apricot plum
 Prunus sogdiana – Sogdian plum
 Prunus spinosa – sloe
 Prunus tadzhikistanica – Tajik plum
 Prunus ursina – bear's plum
 Prunus ussuriensis – Manchurian plum
 Prunus vachuschtii – alucha

Hybrid species (some of them are hybrids with species of other sections):
 Prunus × blireiana – double-flowering plum
 Prunus × cistena – purple-leaf sand cherry
 Prunus × ferganica – Fergana plum
 Prunus × foveata – pitted-stone plum
 Prunus × fruticans
 Prunus × rossica – Russian plum
 Prunus × simmleri
The taxonomic position of P. brigantina is disputed. It is grouped with species of Prunus sect. Prunus according to chloroplast DNA sequences, but more closely related to species of Prunus sect. Armeniaca according to nuclear DNA sequences.

References 

Prunus subg. Prunus